Brassart may refer to:

A brassard, an item of military dress or armor
Johannes Brassart, a composer of the Renaissance
Madame Brassart